A mercury switch is an electrical switch that opens and closes a circuit when a small amount of the liquid metal mercury connects metal electrodes to close the circuit. There are several different basic designs (tilt, displacement, radial, etc.) but they all share the common design strength of non-eroding switch contacts.

The most common is the mercury tilt switch. It is in one state (open or closed) when tilted one direction with respect to horizontal, and the other state when tilted the other direction.  This is what older style thermostats used to turn a heater or air conditioner on or off.

The mercury displacement switch uses a 'plunger' that dips into a pool of mercury, raising the level in the container to contact at least one electrode. This design is used in relays in industrial applications that need to switch high current loads frequently. These relays use electromagnetic coils to pull steel sleeves inside hermetically sealed containers.

Description
Mercury switches have one or more sets of electrical contacts in a sealed glass envelope that contains a small quantity of mercury. The envelope may also contain hydrogen at pressure, an inert gas, or a vacuum. Gravity constantly pulls the drop of mercury to the lowest point in the envelope. When the switch is tilted in the appropriate direction, the mercury touches a set of contacts, thus completing an electrical circuit. Tilting the switch in the opposite direction moves the mercury away from that set of contacts, breaking that circuit.<ref>{{cite book |first=Jacob |last=Fraden |title=Handbook of Modern Sensors - Physics, Designs and Applications (3rd Edition) |publisher=Springer - Verlag |year=2004 |pages= 256–257 }}</ref> The switch may contain multiple sets of contacts, closing different sets at different angles, allowing, for example, single-pole, double-throw (SPDT) operation.

Advantages
Mercury switches offer several advantages over other switch types:
 The contacts are enclosed, so oxidation of the contact points is impossible. 
 In hazardous locations, interrupting the circuit does not emit a spark that could ignite flammable gases.  
 Contacts stay clean, and even if an internal arc occurs, the contact surfaces renew on every operation, so they don't wear out. 
 Even a small drop of mercury has low resistance, so switches can carry useful amounts of current in a small size. 
 Sensitivity of the drop to gravity provides a unique sensing function, and lends itself to simple, low-force mechanisms for manual or automatic operation. 
 The switches are quiet, as no contacts abruptly snap together. 
 The mass of the moving mercury drop provides an over center effect to avoid chattering as the switch tilts. 
 The envelope can include contacts for two or more circuits.

Disadvantages
Mercury switches have several disadvantages:
 There is a tendency for the intermittently exposed electrode to become damaged by the intense heat and destructive force of the electrical arc that forms whenever the circuit opens or closes, particularly if the circuit is being opened under a large inductive load.  Certain refractory materials have been used to encase this electrode to mitigate this effect
 Their relatively slow operating rate (due to the inertia of the mercury drop) makes them unsuitable for applications that require many operating cycles per second.  
 Glass envelopes and wire electrodes may be fragile and require flexible leads to prevent damage to the envelope. 
 The mercury drop forms a common electrode, so circuits are not isolated from each other in a multi-pole switch.
 Their sensitivity to gravity may make them unsuitable in portable or mobile devices that can change orientation or vibrate. 
 Mercury compounds are highly toxic and accumulate in any food chain, so safety codes exclude mercury in many new designs.

Uses
Roll sensing
Tilt switches provide a rollover or tip over warning for applications like construction equipment and lift vehicles that operate in rugged terrain. There are several non-mercury types, but few are implemented due to sensitivity to shock and vibration, causing false tripping. However, devices resistant to shock and vibration do exist.

 Automotive uses 
Automobile manufacturers once used mercury switches for lighting controls (for example, trunk lid lights), ride control, and anti-lock braking systems. Scrapped automobiles can leak mercury to the environment if these switches are not properly removed. Since 2003, new American-built cars no longer use mercury switches.Organisation for Economic Co-operation and Development, Instrument mixes for environmental policy  OECD Publishing, 2007,, pg.145

Fall alarms
Work performed in confined space (such as a welder inside a tank) raises special safety concerns. Tilt switches sound an alarm if a worker falls over.

Aircraft attitude indicators/artificial horizons
Electrically driven attitude indicators typically use mercury switches to keep the gyro axis vertical. When the gyro is off vertical, mercury switches trigger torque motors that move the gyro position back to the correct position. (Air driven attitude indicators use a different operating principle.)

Thermostats
Mercury switches were once common in bimetal thermostats. The weight of the movable mercury drop provided some hysteresis by a degree of over-center action. The bimetal spring had to move further to overcome the weight of the mercury, tending to hold it in the open or closed position. The mercury also provided positive on-off switching, and could withstand millions of cycles without contact degradation.

 Doorbells 
Some old doorbells, for example, the Soviet ZM-1U4, use mercury switches as current interrupters.

Pressure switches
Some pressure switches use a Bourdon tube and a mercury switch. The small force generated by the tube reliably operates the switch.

Vending
Mercury switches are still used in electro-mechanical systems where physical orientation of actuators or rotors is a factor. They are also commonly used in vending machines for tilt alarms'' that detect when someone tries to rock or tilt the machine to make it vend a product.

Bombs

A tilt switch can trigger a bomb. Mercury tilt switches can be found in some bomb and landmine fuzes, typically in the form of anti-handling devices, for example, a variant of the VS-50 mine.

Toxicity
Since mercury is a toxic heavy metal, devices containing mercury switches must be treated as hazardous waste for disposal. Because it is now RoHS restricted, most modern applications have eliminated it. A metal ball and contact wires can directly replace it, but may require additional circuitry to eliminate switch bounce. Low-precision thermostats use a bimetal strip and a switch contact. Precision thermostats use a thermistor or silicon temperature sensor. Low-cost accelerometers replace the mercury tilt switch in precision applications.

In the United States, the Environmental Protection Agency (EPA) regulates the disposition and release of mercury. Individual states and localities may enact further regulations on the use or disposition of mercury.

See also

 Mercury-arc valve, a rectifier device intended for high electrical voltages/currents
 Mercury battery, an electrochemical battery
 Mercury coulometer, an electro analytical chemistry device that determines the amount of matter transformed during a mercury reaction
 Mercury probe, an electrical probing device to sample for electrical characterization
 Mercury swivel commutator, an electrical circuit, current-reversing switch using the element mercury
 Mercury-wetted relay
 Mercury relay

References

External links

 How to Adapt a Mercury Switch for Robot Control

Heating, ventilation, and air conditioning
Switches
Mercury (element)

fr:Interrupteur#Mercure